The Miami Pop Festival was a rock festival that took place from December 28-30, 1968, at Gulfstream Park, a horse racing track in Hallandale, Florida, just north of Miami. It is sometimes confused with a separate event that took place seven months earlier, at the same venue, though the two events were unrelated. The earlier event was officially publicized on promotional materials and in radio ads as the "1968 Pop and Underground Festival," and "The 1968 Pop Festival," but later came to be referred to colloquially as the "Miami" Pop Festival, a practice which has led to confusion between the two events.

History
The Miami Pop Festival was the first major rock festival on America's east coast.  It was produced by a team led by Tom Rounds and Mel Lawrence, who had previously produced the seminal KFRC Fantasy Fair and Magic Mountain Music Festival on Mount Tamalpais in Marin County, California. The crowd size for the three days was estimated to be around 100,000.

Performers covered a wide range of music genres, and included:

 The Amboy Dukes
 Chuck Berry
 Blues Image
 The Box Tops
 Paul Butterfield Blues Band
 Canned Heat
 Wayne Cochran
 Cosmic Drum (aka Train of Thought)
 James Cotton Blues Band
 Country Joe and the Fish
 José Feliciano
 Fish Ray
 Flatt and Scruggs
 Fleetwood Mac
 Marvin Gaye
 The Grass Roots
 Grateful Dead
 Richie Havens
 Ian & Sylvia
 Iron Butterfly
 Junior Junkanoos
 Jr. Walker & The Allstars
 The Charles Lloyd Quartet
 Hugh Masekela
 Joni Mitchell
 Pacific Gas & Electric
 Procol Harum
 Terry Reid
 Buffy Sainte-Marie
 Steppenwolf
 The Sweet Inspirations
 Sweetwater
 Joe Tex
 Three Dog Night
 The Turtles 

Many of these musicians were cast as superheroes in a commemorative comic book distributed at the event.  Interesting moments during the festival included:  Joni Mitchell inviting former Hollies member and new love interest Graham Nash, as well as Richie Havens to join her onstage to sing Dino Valenti's "Get Together";  Jefferson Airplane's Jack Casady playing bass guitar with Country Joe & the Fish;  and folksinger/songwriter icon and Coconut Grove resident Fred Neil stopping in at the festival one day to hang out and enjoy the music. Several acts advertised in early promotional materials did not appear, and their names were removed from subsequent promotions, including John Mayall's Bluesbreakers, Dino Valenti and H.P. Lovecraft.  Two bands who were expected to appear were unable to perform due to last-minute problems:  The McCoys got snowbound in Canada and Booker T. Jones of Booker T. & the M.G.'s got the flu.

This festival was unique in that it was the first rock festival to have two entirely separate 'main' stages several hundred yards apart (the Flower Stage and the Flying Stage), both operating simultaneously and offering performers of equal calibre.

See also

List of historic rock festivals

References

External links
Miami Pop Festival December 28-30, 1968, as chronicled by The Strip Project
Facebook Miami Pop Festival community group page
Photos of Flatt & Scruggs at the Miami Pop Festival

Music festivals in Miami
1968 in Florida
1968 in American music
Counterculture festivals
Music festivals established in 1968
1968 music festivals